The Vampire of the Opera is a 1964 Italian horror film co-written and directed  by Renato Polselli and starring Marco Mariani and  Giuseppe Addobbati.

Plot

Cast

  Marco Mariani as Sandro 
 Giuseppe Addobbati as Stefano 
 Barbara Hawards as Giulia 
  Alberto Archetti as Achille 
  Carla Cavalli as Aurora 
 Aldo Nicodemi as Aldo 
  Jody Excell as Yvette 
 Milena Vukotic as Carlotta

Production
The film had a very troubled production. Produced by Rossano Brazzi's brother, Oscar Brazzi, shooting started in 1961, but because of budget issues it was ended only in 1964.

Initially conceived as a sequel of Polselli's 1960 horror film The Vampire and the Ballerina, it had the working title "Il vampiro dell'opera", but because of the diminished interest of Italian audience in vampire films, when released it was eventually renamed, replacing the world vampire with monster ("mostro").

Ernesto Gastaldi is credited as screenwriter, but according to him, he wrote only the treatment and made a few corrections to the script. The film was shot in Narni.

Release
The Vampire of the Opera was released in Italy on June 30, 1964 where it was distributed by Nord Industrial.

Reception
In his book Italian Horror Film Directors, Louis Paul noted the similarities with Polselli's The Vampire and the Ballerina, both in "his fascination with full-bodied voluptuous actresses as well as the cheap and exploitative premise." Similarly, Roberto Curti described the film as a variation on The Vampire and the Ballerina and on  The Playgirls and the Vampire by Piero Regnoli, "i.e., a pretext for showing scantily clad young women, with a little hint of lesbianism to spice up the proceedings."

References

Footnotes

Sources

External links

1964 horror films
1964 films
Italian vampire films
Films shot in Italy
Films with screenplays by Ernesto Gastaldi
Films directed by Renato Polselli
1960s Italian films